Pleasant Grove, Texas is an unincorporated community in Falls County, Texas, USA, located on FM 1048.

History
A church and school were built in town by the late 19th century. The school district consolidated with Rosebud-Lott Independent School District in 1953. The population peaked at about seventy in the 1930s. It has remained at a steady 35 residents since the 1970s.

References

Unincorporated communities in Texas
Unincorporated communities in Falls County, Texas